Black in the Saddle is an album by American country rapper Cowboy Troy. It is his second major-label album, released in 2007 on Warner Bros. Records. None of the album's singles entered the Billboard singles charts.

As with his previous album Loco Motive, this album features several guest musicians, including fellow MuzikMafia members Big & Rich and James Otto. Angela Hacker, a 2007 winner on the talent competition Nashville Star, is also featured on the tracks "Lock Me Up" and "Hick Chick".

Track listing 
 "Buffalo Stampede" (Troy Coleman, Brian Nutter) – 4:05
 feat. M. Shadows of Avenged Sevenfold
 "Lock Me Up" (Coleman, John Rich, Max Abrams) – 2:59
 feat. John Rich (as J. Money) and Angela Hacker
 "How Can You Hate Me?" (Coleman, Adam Shoenfeld) – 3:51
 "Take Your Best Shot Now" (Coleman, Michael Bradford) – 4:05
 "Hick Chick" (Coleman, Rich) – 3:43
 feat. Angela Hacker
 "Man with the Microphone" (Coleman, Rich) – 4:18
 "My Bowtie" (Coleman, Bobby Pinson) – 2:57
 "Cruise Control" (Coleman, Bob DiPiero) – 3:47
 feat. James Otto
 "Paranoid Like Me ('Tis the Season of Discontent)" (Coleman, Rich) – 5:10
 "Blackneck Boogie" (Coleman) – 3:05
 "Hick Chick" (dance mix) (Coleman, Rich) – 3:46
 "I Play Chicken with the Train" (Barn Dance mix) (Coleman, Rich, Angie Aparo) – 4:17
 feat. Big & Rich

Personnel 
As listed in liner notes.

Tracks 1-11 
 Paul Allen – electric guitar, acoustic guitar
 Jeff Armstrong – synthesizer
 Sara Beck – background vocals
 Larry Babb – drums
 Steve Brewster – drums, shaker
 Mike Brignardello – bass guitar
 Gary Burnette – electric guitar
 Joeie Canaday – bass guitar
 Randy Kohrs – lap steel guitar, Dobro
 James Pennebaker – pedal steel guitar
 John Rich (as J. Money) – background vocals
 Jeffery Roach – synthesizers, keyboards, piano, timpani
 Michael Rojas – keyboards, Hammond B–3 organ
 Adam Shoenfeld – electric guitar, acoustic guitar
 Glenn Worf – bass guitar
 Jonathan Yudkin – fiddle, banjo, mandolin, strings
 M.Shadows- Vocals on Buffalo Stampede

Track 12 
 Paul Allen – electric guitar
 Brian Barnett – drums
 Larry Franklin – fiddle
 James Pennebaker – electric guitar
 Ethan Pilzer - bass guitar
 John Rich (as J. Money) – harmony vocals, acoustic guitar
 Adam Shoenfeld – electric guitar
 Jonathan Yudkin – fiddle

Chart performance

References 

Cowboy Troy albums
Warner Records albums
Albums produced by John Rich
2007 albums
Country rap albums